Adapromine is an antiviral drug of the adamantane group related to amantadine (1-aminoadamantane), rimantadine (1-(1-aminoethyl)adamantane), and memantine (1-amino-3,5-dimethyladamantane) that is marketed in Russia for the treatment and prevention of influenza. It is an alkyl analogue of rimantadine and is similar to rimantadine in its antiviral activity but possesses a broader spectrum of action, being effective against influenza viruses of both type A and B. Strains of type A influenza virus with resistance to adapromine and rimantadine and the related drug deitiforine were encountered in Mongolia and the Soviet Union in the 1980s.

Electroencephalography (EEG) studies of animals suggest that adapromine and related adamantanes including amantadine, bromantane (1-amino-2-bromophenyladamantane), and memantine have psychostimulant-like and possibly antidepressant-like effects, and that these effects may be mediated via catecholaminergic processes. These psychostimulant effects differ qualitatively from those of conventional psychostimulants like amphetamine however, and the adamantane derivatives have been described contrarily as "adaptogens" and as "actoprotectors".

In 2004, it was discovered that amantadine and memantine bind to and act as agonists of the σ1 receptor (Ki = 7.44 μM and 2.60 μM, respectively) and that activation of the σ1 receptor is involved in the dopaminergic effects of amantadine at therapeutically relevant concentrations. These findings might also extend to the other adamantanes such as adapromine, rimantadine, and bromantane and could explain the psychostimulant-like effects of this family of compounds.

See also
 Tromantadine

References

Adamantanes
Amines
Anti-influenza agents
Anti–RNA virus drugs
Russian drugs
Stimulants
Drugs in the Soviet Union